The R941 road is a regional road in Ireland linking the N52 and the R164 in Kells in County Meath.

See also 

 Roads in Ireland
 National primary road
 National secondary road

References 

Regional roads in the Republic of Ireland
Roads in County Meath